Bansi Pandit (Kashmir, June 1, 1942)
is a writer and speaker on Hinduism.

Originally from Kashmir, Pandit is a nuclear engineer and lives in Glen Ellyn, Illinois, USA.
He is the author of several books,

Works
Hindu Dharma (1996) 
Fundamentals of Hindu Religion and Philosophy for All Ages (1998) 
Explore Hinduism (2005) 
Who Are Kashmiri Pandits (2015) 
Hindus of Kashmir - A Genocide Forgotten (2021) 
Isha Upanishad For Beginners (2021) 
Yajnopavita - The Sacred Thread (2020)

References

External links
 Bansi Pandit's home page

1942 births
Living people
People from Glen Ellyn, Illinois
American nuclear engineers
Engineers from Illinois
Kashmiri people